Mithai ( Sweet) is a 2021 Indian Bengali romantic comedy drama television series that premiered on 4 January 2021 on Zee Bangla. The show is also available on the digital platform ZEE5 before its telecast. The show is produced by Zee Bangla. It stars Soumitrisha Kundu as Mithai Modak and Adrit Roy as Siddhartha Modak.

Plot
Mithai is a cheerful sweetseller mean while Siddharth is a grumpy gentleman who hates sweet. Later on both of them get married and the series is based on their sweet love life. Along with that the life of Ratul, Nipa, Sree, Rajib, Nanda, Rudra, Som, Torsha is also portrayed and the story also revolves around their family business "Siddheshwar Modak" named after Siddharth's grandfather.

Cast

Main
 Soumitrisha Kundu (In a dual role) as
 Mithai Modak (Das) – A former sweet seller turned businesswoman of Siddheshwar Modak Group; Sudip and Parbati's daughter; Gulti's cousin; Siddharth's wife; Shakya and Mishti's mother.
 Mithi Biswas – Mithai's lookalike; Mahendra's daughter; Shakya's governess.
 Adrit Roy as Siddharth Modak aka Sid/Ucche Babu /Singho Moshai / Ricky Roy (a Rockstar in disguise) – Former senior executive in PCG and Former head of Siddheshwar Modak Group turned Intelligence officer; Samu and Arati's son; Anuradha's step-son; Sree's brother; Som's adoptive brother; Nanda, Sandy and Nipa's cousin; Mithai's husband; Shakya and Mishti's father.
 Dhritishman Chakraborty as Shakya Modak – Mithai and Siddharth's son; Mishti's elder brother; Mithi's student.
 Anumegha Kahali as Mishti Modak – Mithai and Siddharth's daughter; Shakya's younger sister.

Recurring
 Biswajit Chakraborty as Siddheshwar "Sidhu" Modak – Head and Owner of Siddheshwar Modak Group; Sushoma's husband; Samu, Amu and Apa's father; Nanda, Siddharth, Sandy, Sree and Nipa's grandfather; Som's adoptive grandfather; Shakya, Mishti and Srishti's great-grandfather.
 Swagata Basu as Sushoma Ghosh Modak – Matriarch of Modak family; Sushovan's sister; Siddheshwar's wife; Samu, Amu and Apa's mother; Nanda, Siddharth, Sandy, Sree and Nipa's grandmother; Som's adoptive grandmother; Shakya, Mishti and Srishti's great-grandmother.
 Kaushik Chakraborty as Samaresh "Samu" Modak – Siddheshwar and Sushoma's elder son; Amu and Apa's brother; Arati's widower; Anuradha's husband; Siddharth and Sreetama's father; Som's adoptive father; Shakya and Mishti's grandfather.
 Moyna Mukherjee as Arati Modak – Samaresh's first wife; Siddharth and Sreetama's mother; Som's adoptive mother; Parbati's close friend; Shakya and Mishti's grandmother. (Deceased)
 Bidipta Chakraborty as Anuradha "Anu" Modak – A famous interior designer; Lalita's daughter; Samu's second wife; Som, Siddharth and Sree's step-mother; Shakya and Mishti's step-grandmother.
 Diya Mukherjee as Sreetama "Sree" Modak Mitra – Samu and Arati's daughter; Anuradha's step-daughter; Siddharth's sister; Som's adoptive sister; Nanda, Sandy and Nipa's cousin; Ratul's wife.
 Uday Pratap Singh Rajput as Ratul Mitra – Animesh and Susmita's younger son; Rajib's brother; Dhara's cousin; Mithai's friend; Sree's husband.
 Priyam Chakraborty / Kaushambi Chakraborty as Sreenanda "Nanda" Bose Mitra – Apa and Brotin's daughter; Siddharth, Sree, Sandy and Nipa's cousin; Som's adoptive cousin; Rajib's wife; Srishti's mother.
 Sourav Chatterjee as Rajib Mitra – Animesh and Susmita's elder Ratul's brother; Dhara's cousin; Nanda's husband; Sristhi's father.
 Dhrubajyoti Sarkar as Somdeb "Som" Modak – Tridibesh and Joyeeta's son; Samu and Arati's adoptive son; Anuradha's step-son; Siddharth and Sree's adoptive brother; Nanda, Sandy and Nipa's cousin; Sangita's love-interest; Torsha's husband. 
 Tonni Laha Roy as Torsha "Tess" Roy Modak – Reboti's daughter; Siddharth's former love interest, friend and colleague; Mithai's former rival; Som's wife.
 Biswabasu Biswas / Omkar Bhattacharya as Sandeep "Sandy" Modak – Amu and Lata's son; Nipa's brother; Nanda, Siddharth and Sree's cousin; Som's adoptive cousin; Pinky's former teacher and husband.
 Ananya Guha as Pinky Agarwal Modak – Omi and Aditya's sister; Sandy's former student and wife.
 Oindrila Saha as Sreenipa "Nipa" Modak Banerjee – Amu and Lata's daughter; Sandy's sister; Nanda, Siddharth and Sree's cousin; Som's adoptive cousin; Rudra's wife. 
 Fahim Mirza as ACP Rudradeb "Rudra" Banerjee – Siddharth's senior and best friend; Nipa's husband.
 Sandip Chakraborty as Amaresh "Amu" Modak – Siddheshwar and Sushoma's younger son; Samu and Apa's brother; Lata's husband; Nanda, Siddharth and Sree's uncle, Som's adoptive uncle; Sandy and Nipa's father.
 Lopamudra Sinha as Sulata "Lata" Modak aka Lata – Amu's wife; Nanda, Siddharth and Sree's aunt, Som's adoptive aunt; Sandy and Nipa's mother. 
 Arpita Mukherjee as Aparajita "Apa" Modak Bose – Siddheshwar and Sushoma's daughter; Samu and Amu's sister; Brotin's wife; Siddharth, Sree, Nipa and Sandy's aunt, Som's adoptive aunt; Nanda's mother; Srishti's maternal grandmother.
 Arijit Chowdhury / Raja Chatterjee as Brotin Bose – Apa's husband; Siddharth, Sree, Nipa and Sandy's uncle, Som's adoptive uncle; Nanda's father; Srishti's  maternal grandfather.
 Arkoja Acharya as Basundhara "Dhara" Basu – An IPS Officer; Rajib and Ratul's cousin; Rudra's old crush and close friend.
 Boni Mukherjee as Parbati Das – Sudip's wife; Mithai's mother; Arati's close friend; Shakya and Mishti's grandmother. (Deceased)
 Debrishi Chatterjee as Gulti Das – Saswati and Gour's son; Mithai's cousin. 
 Suchandra Banerjee as Saswati Das – Gour's wife; Gulti's mother.
 Arnab Bhadra as Gour Das – Saswati's husband; Gulti's father. 
 Aditi Chatterjee as Reboti Roy – A lawyer; Torsha's mother.
 Neil Chatterjee as Aditya Agarwal – Modak family business rival; Omi and Pinky's brother; Siddhartha's childhood friend.
 Subhajit Banerjee as Roshan Bajaj / Aditya Agarwal (after Surgery) / Parikshit Sharma.
 Arghya Mukherjee as Animesh Mitra – Susmita's husband; Rajib and Ratul's father; Srishti's paternal grandfather.
 Sanjuktaa Roy Chowdhury as Susmita Pal Mitra – Animesh's wife; Rajib and Ratul's mother; Srishti's paternal grandmother.
 Niladri Lahiri as Arunesh Ghosh – Former PCG Kolkata branch head; Siddhartha's former boss.
 Gautam Mukherjee as Pratul Biswas – A criminal and divorce lawyer and long time customer of Siddheshwar Sweets; Mithai's namesake uncle.
 Partha Sarathi Deb as Sushovan Ghosh – Sushoma's brother.
 Indranil Mallick as Indra – Sreetama's senior, friend and also her one-sided lover.
 Samir Biswas as Swami Achutananda Maharaj – Gurudeb of Ashram. (Gurukunja)
 Anindya Chakrabarti as Dr. Tridibesh "Tridib" Basu – Samu's former close friend; Joyeeta's former lover; Som's father.
 Rupsha Guha as Joyeeta Dutta – Samu and Tridibesh's former lover; Som's mother.
 Raktim Samanta as Ganeshwar aka Ghontu – Modak family's relative; Nosu's son; Makhon's brother.  
 Debapratim Dasgupta as Nosu – Ghontu's father; Samu, Amu and Apa's cousin.
 Promita Chakraborty as Satarupa aka Satty – NRI college friend of Siddharth and Torsha.
 Kunal Banerjee as Kunal – Satty's husband.
 John Bhattacharya as Omi Agarwal / (Monindronath in disguise) – Aditya and Pinky's brother. (Dead) 
 Dwaipayan Das as Gogol Mitra – A student and group partner of Mithai at Excel English Academy..
 Deerghoi Paul as Julie - Gogol's girlfriend.
 Sudeshna Roy as Mrs. Chatterjee - English tutor at Excel English Academy.
 Kheyali Dastidar as Sreetama's college teacher aka Hitler mam.
 Arindam Ganguly as Nabin – Husband of Sreetama's college teacher.
 Suchandrima as Madhuchanda Roy – Chief nutritionist at "Wellness Multi-Speciality Hospital".
 Vicky Nandy as Pratik Sanyal – A journalist from Daily News Express who  interviewed Mithai.
 Shraboni Bonik as Mandira Chatterjee – A famous industrialist.
 Anuradha Mukherjee as Priyanjali Sen aka Angie – Ricky's fake girlfriend.
 Saptarshi Roy as Aniruddha Sen – Angie's father.
 Bhavana Banerjee as Channel Coordinator of the serial in which Pinky and Sulata act.
 Ananda Chowdhury as Suman – Director of the serial in which Pinky and Sulata act.
 Baisakhi Marjit as Lalita – Siddheshwar's childhood friend; Anuradha's mother; Samaresh's mother-in-law,  a socialite.
 Rudrajit Mukherjee as Sudipto Roy – A special crime branch officer, Rudra's junior colleague.
 Arijita Mukhopadhyay as Promila Laha – A counsellor of F.C.P.
 Subrata Guha Roy as Tarak – Owner of the House the Modaks have rented.
 Gora Dhar as Goju – Promila's right hand.
 Oeandrila Banerjee as Ratri Chatterjee – Head of PCG Kolkata Branch.
 Ashmita Chakraborty as Dr. Sharmistha Banerjee – a Gynaecologist who performed Mithai's delivery.
 Arpita Ghosh as Soumi – Nipa's cousin sister. 
 Debraj Mukherjee as Mahendra Biswas – Mithi's father
 Sam Bhattacharya as Prantik – Mithi's former lover.
 Aritram Mukherjee as Sayan – Siddhartha's assistant.
 Riya Dutta as Megha – Siddhartha's assistant.
 Sangita Ghosh as Sangeeta – Som's love interest.
 Nofor Chandra Das - Owner of Nofor Chandra Mistanna Bhandar .
 Swarnadipto Ghosh as Rony Chandra Das – Nofor Chandra Das' son; Rajani's elder brother. 
 Shilpa Mondal as Rajani Chandra Das – Nofor Chandra Das' daughter; Rony's younger sister.
 Arindya Banerjee as Dr. Rohit Banerjee - a psychiatrist who treats Mithai's retrograde amnesia which occurred after the fire breakout in Banskhali godown.

Guest appearance
 Ditipriya Roy as herself  at the opening ceremony of "Mithai Hub"
 Soumili Biswas as herself – judge of cooking show Healthy হেশেল
 Mimi Dutta as herself – Anchor of cooking show Healthy হেশেল
 Jayanta Banerjee as himself – judge of cooking show Healthy হেশেল
 Jojo Mukherjee as herself – an entertainer in the cooking show Healthy হেশেল
 Ankush Hazra as himself at the Marriage Anniversary Party of Som and Torsha to promote to his web series "Shikarpur".
 Sandipta Sen as herself at the Marriage Anniversary Party of Som and Torsha to promote to her web series "Shikarpur".

Production

Critics
The Times of India quoted the series that "Mithai will tell you a sweet love story".

Viewership
Mithai became the most watched television series in Bengal. Beginning with a good viewership, after a few weeks, the series soon became the top rated Bengali television program garnering a record viewership, maintaining the first position consistently in the BARC's weekly viewership charts. As on week 4 of 2022, Mithai had been holding the top position on West Bengal Television TRP charts since last 44 weeks starting week 13 of 2021.

Special episodes
 On 15 April 2021, Mithai held a Mega episode titled as "Mithai Boishakhi Halkhata" marking the 100th episode which is aired for two hours on Thursday. This special episode successfully received 5.94 million impressions and occupied the first position of the TRP rating in Week 15 of 2021.
 On 14 February 2022, Mithai held a Mega episode titled as "1 ghanta Mahaparba" which is aired for one hours on Monday.

In popular culture
There was a clip of an episode where Mithai (Soumitrisha Kundu) made a new sweet named Uchche Babu. A fan made this sweet in real life and soon it went viral on social media. Few days later, this sweet hit the markets.

Reception

TRP Ratings

2021

2022

2023

Adaptations

Soundtrack 

The title song "Tar nam Mithai" is a music composed by Suvam Moitra and sung by Chandrika Bhattacharya. The song was created for the series.

References

External links

Mithai at ZEE5

Bengali-language television programming in India
Zee Bangla original programming
2021 Indian television series debuts